Latin Soul Syndicate is a San Francisco-based band that formed in 2003. On each of their three albums, the core members (Happy Sanchez, Karl Perazzo, and Mark Pistel) are joined by a collective of Bay Area-based musicians including members of Santana, Tower of Power and Spearhead.

Their songs include a blend of upbeat Latin soul, electronica and pop/rock. Over the years, their songs have been licensed in films and TV shows including The Sopranos and The Devil Wears Prada. The group has released three albums of original music on independent record label LoveCat Music. Their songs have been included on various compilation CDs including Latin Travels Volume 2 and Latin Moderns. narcotrafico is the soundtrack of the game scarface.

Their songs "Vato Loco" featured in the film The Devil Wears Prada (2006) and "El Gitano del Amor" in The Ugly Truth (2009) film. They also had their song Narco Traffico featured in the game Scarface: The World Is Yours and Mamasita in The Slammin' Salmon.

Discography

Albums
Latin Soul Syndicate  2003
The Adventures Of Johnny Loco  2006
Chicano Connection  2009

Compilations
Latin Moderns Volume 1, 2004
Latin Moderns Volume 2, 2007
Latin Travels Volume 2, 2006

External links
  Latin Soul Syndicate on MySpace*
[  Latin Soul Syndicate at AllMusic*]
                                    LSS in ASCAP Playback

Salsa musicians
Latin jazz musicians
Latin American music
Musical groups from San Francisco
Musical collectives
Musical groups established in 2003
Rock en Español musicians